St Andrew's High School is located in Worthing, West Sussex, catchment area. It was founded in 1897.

The 1890s
St Andrew's Church Clifton Road, Worthing was consecrated on Trinity Sunday, 27 May 1888. However it was to be a further nine years before the school was opened. Lady Loder, of Beach House, bought the land north of the church in 1893, at a cost of £580, for a school. However, plans were delayed for 2 years due to an epidemic of typhoid. The plans were finally approved in February 1895. The committee consisted of the Vicar, Mrs. Crowther-Benyon, Lady Loder, Mr Wedd and others. In 1896 an appeal was launched for funds and the school finally opened its doors to pupils on 25 January 1897 at the cost of £1850.

To mark the 10th anniversary of the church, Lady Loder gave a further £500 to the school. Joseph Theakstone was its first head teacher. Mr. Athelston Riley, one of the editors of the English Hymnal, opened the school. The Mayor attended the event and the school hall was the venue for luncheon.

The new school's Coat of Arms was (and remains) the 'Saltire' Cross of St Andrew with the motto Nihil Sine Labore (Nothing Without Effort).

By 1 February, 128 pupils had registered with there being some free places. Others paid a fee of between 3d and 6d a week. The curriculum included Reading, Writing, Spelling, Poetry, Arithmetic, Scripture, Science, Geography, Shorthand, French, Book keeping, Domestic Economy, Cookery and Singing. In these early days there were girls admitted to the school. Physical Education included swings for the girls, parallel bars for the boys and Swedish Drill had to be performed inside if the weather was bad.

1897 nationally was an important year as it was Queen Victoria's Diamond Jubilee and it is recorded that the girls made white crosses to smarten up their school clothes. The school continued to grow with 205 pupils on the register by April. Blue serge caps with a silken badge were now on sale for 11d.

Senior staff received £80 pa while pupil teachers' only £12 pa. By the end of this year H.M.I. wrote, "This is in all respects - discipline, teaching, appliances - a thoroughly good school. But I am inclined to think that too many subjects are placed on the timetable."

The 1900s

From the school logs we can see that on 20 June 1900 the Headmaster, Robert Parkinson, wrote, "During the last fortnight I have examined the school. Standard I, II are in excellent order. Standard III, IV are under one teacher and very crowded and consequently work is not thorough. Standard V, VI lack brightness. The work is well taught but the tone is low. Standard VI arithmetic is very weak".

The Worthing Observer of Sunday 31 March 1901 advertised "Evening Classes" of Cookery, Dressmaking, Home Nursing and Ambulance work.

Earlier in this month the Medical Officer of Health closed the school for 3 weeks due to a measles epidemic. By 1907 the school had 281 senior pupils and 76 infants of whom Miss L. Dunston was in charge with Mr Parkinson in overall charge as Head.

The 1910s
Music and drama featured prominently in the early history of the school and in January 1913 an evening of entertainment was arranged to raise money for the Sports Fund. Staff and pupils took part in a varied programme.

In 1914 Mr. Parkinson sold off superfluous land and enlarged the school to include 6 classrooms and 2 cloakrooms. Princess Marie Louise of Schleswig-Holstein opened these extensions in September of this year.

1920s
On 16 April 1928 the school became a Church Senior Boys School. The girls were transferred to Davison School and the remaining 171 boys were placed in 4 forms according to ability in English and Arithmetic. Also in this year Mr. Desborough became head and Miss Dunston retired after 30 years service. Gardening was added to the curriculum in 1929 with crops being grown in the grounds of the Vicarage in Rectory Road and at No. 6 Southey Road

1930s
In 1931 the infant classes were transferred to Christ Church and Holy Trinity Schools.
The late 1930s saw the outbreak of war and in the autumn of 1938 the school was temporarily closed so that staff could distribute gas masks to the people of Worthing. Also the Music and PT teacher Derrick Cressey was called up and the 7 classes had to be reduced to 6. The autumn term was delayed as the school was used to billet London evacuees.

The 1940s
An appeal had been launched in 1939 to raise £2,500 for extensions to the school and a new science and woodwork room was opened in June 1940 by The Bishop of Lewes. 63 boys and 3 staff were evacuated to Nottinghamshire in 1941. In February 1943 the school log shows that there was machine gunning over the playground and bombs exploding nearby. On 8 and 9 May 1945 a National Holiday to celebrate the surrender of Germany was held. A week later the Cigarette Fund realised £8-0-4 which meant that 160 tins of cigarettes could be dispatched to forces by the Overseas League.

During the war staff supervised boys picking peas at Roundstone Farm to improve productivity. Also the war claimed the lives of 30 old boys. By the end of the war the Headmaster Mr Parrit had less than 100 pupils and due to austerity very little was done to celebrate the schools 50th birthday in 1947. In 1948 the school had its first open day in 10 years. The Mayor attended and presented cups and prizes.

1950s
Sussex Road School was appropriated as temporary additional accommodation as the school was fully subscribed. A new floor was laid in the hall in 1954 and the Parent Staff Association founded in 1956. September 1958 saw 35 St. Andrew's boys taking part in extended courses to attempt their GCEs. St Andrew's championed the newly established the Duke of Edinburgh's Award Scheme.

1960s The
St. Andrew's was now on spread over three sites.  To remedy this a new school was built in Sackville Road. The foundation stone was laid by the Mayor, Mrs. M I Keele, on 14 May 1963 and dedicated by the Bishop of Chichester The Right Reverend Roger P. Wilson.

The Parent Staff Association raised £1000 for an organ to be installed in the new school in keeping with its association with St. Andrew's Church. They also raised another £700 for a statue of St. Andrew to be placed at the school's main entrance. The school on Sackville Road opened at a cost of £203,000 (75s 10d per sq ft). Keith Andrew Ltd of Worthing built it and a 9-foot bronze cross was erected under the instruction of the architect Mr. Claridge in keeping with the school's Christian ethos. Pupils helped pack the removal vans and personally carried books to the new site. The library housed some 5,500 books.

1970s
In August 1970 plans to demolish the old Clifton Road School and replace it with flats were raised, and ultimately carried out. 1972 saw the 75th anniversary celebrations along with the official opening and dedication of the new arts centre by the Right Reverend Simon Phipps, Bishop of Horsham. Mr Robin Ellmore (Woodwork) retired after 42 years as did Mr George Robotham, (Maths) after 17 years. Mr John Peckham was appointed Headmaster in September 1975 and Deputy.

1980s
The Chair of Governors, Rev. John Cotton, opened a new Science Lab, at a cost of £15,000, at a short ceremony with a blessing in September 1984 while in September 1986 the Gym was extended. Brighton and Hove Albion Manager, Alan Mullery opened this.

After 10 years of waiting the 3rd Worthing Scout Group finally saw the start of their building work of their new Group Headquarters in the grounds of the school. This also gave the school a hall to use for drama.

The 1990s
On 3 October 1990 the Bishop of Chichester celebrates 25 years on the Sackville Road site. More expansion, this time a £500,000 Sports Hall. This was ready for use in November 1991. Also in 1990 the go ahead was given in December for two new first schools to be built in the Worthing area. One of which, Springfields, is to be built in the grounds of St. Andrew's.

St. Andrew's won the schools' County Cricket Trophy in 1993. A single storey extension was started in May 1995 in the form of a new technology centre costing £177,000. It was ready for use in November of the same year. 1996 saw the retirement of Head teacher, Mr. Peter Stewart after 13 years.  On 8 March 1997 St. Andrew's Church of England School for Boys was 100 years old and in September of the same year a new Head Teacher was appointed, Mr. Steve Jewell.

In September 1998, St. Andrew's won the Potter Bailey Cricket Trophy after the final against The Angmering School.

The 2000s
A fibreglass statue of St. Andrew casting a fishing net was located in the pond at the school main entrance. This was removed in 2006 because it had deteriorated beyond economic repair. As a replacement and in order to continue to reinforce the Christian ethos of the school, the pupils have designed and constructed some mosaic plaques and other sculptures which are displayed around the outside of the building.

In 2005 the school's rugby team won the Worthing & District trophy for the first and only time in the school's history, beating Angmering 12-10 in the final. Accordingly to a local paper, the victory was made even more impressive by the fact that only two of the St Andrew's rugby team played rugby regularly outside of school. 
A synthetic turf pitch was built and opened in 2005. Student Voice group "Make Learning Better" was created. The Chapel was extended into the indoor pond in 2008 to accommodate the new year 7 pupils. In April 2009, Mr Steve Jewell, Headmaster, left to become the Principal at Littlehampton Academy. On 20 April 2009 Steve Mercer had taken over as Headteacher of the school.

2010s
During the 2009-10 summer holiday break, the school began a 'facelift' project, including a complete refurbishment of the school canteen and new lighting/fans in the main hall. 2010 saw another student voice created in addition to MLB, "SUSTAIN". In 2011 an outdoor classroom was built by SUSTAIN and opened in 2012.

The school completed a building project in 2012 which added a new reception area, offices and meeting rooms. Further to this, another building project took place, completed in 2016 to add more classrooms to the school.

An investment by the Local Authority funded the building of a new Technology Block and a new Arts block together with new catering facilities.

Following a grading of 3 from Ofsted (unsatisfactory) in 2013 the school underwent staffing changes. Ofsted returned to the school following these changes and upgraded the school to the category 'Good' shortly after an inspection under SIAMS - Section 48 gave the school 'Good with Outstanding features.'

Steve Mercer left the school in February 2017 and was replaced by Ian Straw in an interim capacity. In 2018 Ian Straw resigned to accept a headship at The Forest School in Horsham. He was replaced by Louise Welcome, the school's first female headteacher. In 2020 Louise Welcome resigned. In July 2020 West Sussex County Council announced proposals to alter St Andrew's from a single sex boys’ school to a co-educational school from September 2021 entry.

References

External links
 Official school website

Buildings and structures in Worthing
Secondary schools in West Sussex
Church of England secondary schools in the Diocese of Chichester
Educational institutions established in 1897
1897 establishments in England
Voluntary aided schools in England